Portbraddon or Portbraddan is a hamlet in County Antrim, Northern Ireland. The hamlet has an ancient salmon fishing station. A popular saying states that Portbraddon contained the smallest church in Ireland. The building in question was constructed in the 1950s as a cow byre, which the government listed without prior research.

References

Villages in County Antrim